Triple Cross or triple cross may refer to:

 Papal cross, also called a triple cross
 The three-barred Russian Orthodox cross
 The three-barred Maronite cross
 Triple Cross (1966 film), a British film directed by Terence Young
 The Triple Cross, a 1992 Japanese film directed by Kinji Fukasaku

 Triple cross hybrid, in biology via crossbreeding

See also
 XXX (disambiguation)
 Double cross (disambiguation)
 "Treble Cross", the 21st episode of the British Supermarionation television series Captain Scarlet and the Mysterons